The 1938 Denver Pioneers football team was an American football team that represented the University of Denver as a member of the Mountain States Conference (MSC) during the 1938 college football season. In their third season under head coach Bill Saunders, the Pioneers compiled a 4–4–1 record (3–2–1 against conference opponents), tied for second place in the MSC, and were outscored by a total of 86 to 65.

Schedule

References

Denver
Denver Pioneers football seasons
Denver Pioneers football